Eamonn Christopher Darcy (born 7 August 1952) is an Irish professional golfer. He won four times on the European Tour and played in the Ryder Cup four times.

Professional career
Darcy, with a handicap of 12, turned professional at the age of 16, in 1968,.becoming an assistant at Grange Golf Club in Dublin. The following year he moved to Erewash Valley Golf Club in Derbyshire, staying until 1979.

Darcy's tournament career coincided with the start of the European Tour in 1972. He first came to notice in 1974 when he was a joint runner-up in the Nigerian Open. In Europe he was tied for third place in the Portuguese Open and tied sixth in the Dunlop Masters, finishing 36th in the Order of Merit.

Darcy finished third on the Order of Merit in 1975 and made that year's Ryder Cup team, his first of four performances. The following year he was second on the Order of Merit, only behind Ballesteros. Despite a number of great performances, however, Darcy did not win either season. This became something of a trend as Darcy only posted four European Tour wins compared to 13 runner-ups. This was punctuated by his tough-luck playoff record of 0–4.

Darcy's first European Tour win was at the Greater Manchester Open in 1977, handily defeating a trio of British golfers by 8 shots. In the off-season, Darcy would often play on the Australian Tour with much success, winning the 1980 Air New Zealand Shell Open and the 1981 West Lakes Classic. He would also finish runner-up at the 1980 New Zealand Open.

Darcy was a consistent performer on the European Tour in the 1980s, finishing in the top 30 of the Order of Merit eight times. He won the 1983 Benson & Hedges Spanish Open and 1987 Volvo Belgian Open, shooting a final round 64 to defeat Nick Faldo and Ian Woosnam down the stretch. However, his greatest moment may have come at the historic 1987 Ryder Cup. In his last Ryder Cup match, he defeated American Ben Crenshaw on the last hole to secure an individual win and the team's 13th point. His performance was indispensable as it ultimately determined an outright win. (Europe would win by the score 15–13.) His victory was especially memorably because he had an extremely poor Ryder Cup record (0–8–2) entering the match. It was his only Ryder Cup win as an individual (or as a member of team).

Darcy's career began to wind down in the 1990s. He recorded his final official victory at the 1990 Emirates Airlines Desert Classic. The following year, he contended for a major championship for the first time at the 1991 Open Championship. He entered the final round just one shot out of the lead. He could not keep up with the rest of the leaders but his even-par 70 was good enough for T-5, his best finish ever in a major. Though he still kept his card through the decade, 1991 was the last season he was in the top-50 of the Order of Merit. In 2002 he joined the European Seniors Tour.

Darcy was noted for having one of golf's strangest swings.

Professional wins (16)

European Tour wins (4)

*Note: The 1987 Volvo Belgian Open was shortened to 54 holes due to rain.

European Tour playoff record (0–4)

PGA Tour of Australasia wins (2)

PGA Tour of Australasia playoff record (1–0)

Safari Circuit wins (3)

Other wins (7)
1976 Sumrie-Bournemouth Better-Ball (with Christy O'Connor Jnr), Cacharel World Under-25 Championship, Irish Dunlop Tournament
1978 Sumrie-Bournemouth Better-Ball (with Christy O'Connor Jnr)
1981 Carroll's Irish Match Play Championship
1988 Irish National PGA Championship
1992 Irish National PGA Championship

Playoff record
Champions Tour playoff record (0–1)

European Senior Tour playoff record (0–3)

Results in major championships

Note: Darcy only played in The Open Championship.

CUT = missed the half-way cut (3rd round cut in 1975 and 1984 Open Championships)
"T" indicates a tie for a place

Team appearances
Ryder Cup (representing Great Britain and Ireland/Europe): 1975, 1977, 1981, 1987 (winners)
Double Diamond International (representing Ireland): 1975, 1976, 1977
Hennessy Cognac Cup (representing Great Britain and Ireland): 1976 (winners), (representing Ireland) 1984 (captain)
Philip Morris International (representing Ireland): 1976
World Cup (representing Ireland): 1976, 1977, 1983, 1984, 1985, 1987, 1991
Alfred Dunhill Cup (representing Ireland): 1987, 1988 (winners), 1991

See also
List of people on stamps of Ireland

References

External links

Irish male golfers
European Tour golfers
European Senior Tour golfers
Ryder Cup competitors for Europe
RTÉ Sports Person of the Year winners
Sportspeople from County Wicklow
1952 births
Living people